Walter Angus Keeling (November 22, 1873 – January 22, 1945) was a United States district judge of the United States District Court for the Western District of Texas.

Education and career

Born in Kosse, Texas, Keeling received a Bachelor of Laws from the University of Texas School of Law in 1897. He entered private practice in Groesbeck, Texas in 1897. He was an assistant county attorney of Limestone County, Texas from 1898 to 1902. He was county attorney of Limestone County from 1904 to 1908. He was a County Judge of Limestone County from 1908 to 1912. He was an assistant attorney general of Texas from 1912 to 1918. He was first assistant attorney general of Texas from 1918 to 1921. He was the Attorney General of Texas from 1921 to 1925. He was in private practice in Texas from 1925 to 1942.

Federal judicial service

Keeling was nominated by President Franklin D. Roosevelt on January 16, 1942, to a seat on the United States District Court for the Western District of Texas vacated by Judge Robert Johnston McMillan. He was confirmed by the United States Senate on January 26, 1942, and received his commission on January 28, 1942. Keeling served in that capacity until his death on January 22, 1945, in San Antonio, Texas.

References

Sources

External links
 Photograph 1942

1873 births
1945 deaths
People from Kosse, Texas
Judges of the United States District Court for the Western District of Texas
United States district court judges appointed by Franklin D. Roosevelt
20th-century American judges
Texas Attorneys General